During the 1921–22 season Hibernian, a football club based in Edinburgh, finished seventh out of 22 clubs in the Scottish First Division.

Scottish First Division

Final League table

Scottish Cup

See also
List of Hibernian F.C. seasons

References

External links
Hibernian 1921/1922 results and fixtures, Soccerbase

Hibernian F.C. seasons
Hibernian